Maxim Romanov (birth date unknown) is a Russian rugby league footballer who plays as a  for the Kazan Arrows in the Championship of Russia competition.

Background
Maxim Romanov was born in Kazan, Russia.

Playing career
Romanov has  represented the Russian national side on several occasions, most notably at the 2000 World Cup.

References

External links
Maxim Romanov player profile

Living people
Russia national rugby league team players
Russian rugby league players
Footballers from Kazan
Year of birth missing (living people)
Rugby articles needing expert attention